It is supposed that oral literature (and even written literature) in the Asturian language is older, but the first writer known is Antón de Marirreguera in the 17th century. This is a list of the most important known writers in the Asturian language since then:

 Florina Alías (1921-1999) 
 Antón de Marirreguera (c. 1600 – c. 1662)
 Francisco Bernaldo de Quirós Benavides (1675–1710)
 Xosefa Xovellanos (1745–1807)
 Xuan María Acebal (1815–1895)
 Manuel Asur (born 1947)
 María Esther García López (b. 1948)
 Lluis Antón González (born 1955)
 Adolfo Camilo Díaz (born 1963)
 Aurelio González Ovies (born 1964)
 Xuan Bello (born 1965)
 Pablo Antón Marín Estrada (born 1966)
 Xaviel Vilareyo (born 1967)
 Xandru Fernández (born 1970)
 Martín López-Vega (born 1975)

Lists of writers by language
Authors